South Lodge was one of the three lodges in the royal hunting ground of Enfield Chase. It was originally known as the South-bailey alongside the East-bailey and the West-bailey.

The lake from the former gardens of the Lodge survives at Lakeside.

References

Bibliography 

Enfield Chase
Houses in London